The Unincorporated Far West Region is an unincorporated area in the Far West region of New South Wales, Australia. The area is one of only two areas in New South Wales that are not part of any local government area (the other is Lord Howe Island). The region includes several small towns including Tibooburra, Milparinka and Silverton. Silverton and Tibooburra have village councils. The region surrounds Broken Hill, but does not include it, which is in the separate City of Broken Hill local government area.

Demographics
The statistics below refer to a combination of all unincorporated areas of NSW. They had the highest male to female ratio in New South Wales, estimated at 115.5 males per 100 females in 2016.

References

External links
New South Wales Geographical Name Search (names of localities, cadastral counties and parishes etc. in the Unincorporated Far West)
Town list of NSW Department of Local Government

 
Local government areas of New South Wales
Unincorporated areas of New South Wales